Liu Yali (born February 9, 1980, in Zhangjiakou, Hebei) is a female Chinese football (soccer) player who competed at the 2004 Summer Olympics.

In 2004, she was a squad member of the Chinese team which finished ninth in the women's tournament.

External links
profile

1980 births
Living people
Chinese women's footballers
China women's international footballers
2003 FIFA Women's World Cup players
2007 FIFA Women's World Cup players
Sportspeople from Zhangjiakou
Footballers from Hebei
Asian Games medalists in football
Footballers at the 2002 Asian Games
Footballers at the 2006 Asian Games
Asian Games silver medalists for China
Asian Games bronze medalists for China
Women's association football defenders
Medalists at the 2002 Asian Games
Medalists at the 2006 Asian Games